Jamey Richard (born October 9, 1984) is a former American football center. He was drafted by the Indianapolis Colts in the seventh round of the 2008 NFL Draft. He played college football at the University at Buffalo. He was named Male Student-Athlete of the Year at Buffalo following his senior season.

Jamey is the first player from Weston High School to ever play football professionally.

Professional career

Indianapolis Colts
Richard got his first NFL start September 7, 2008 against the Chicago Bears. He replaced Jeff Saturday at center who was injured. On December 28, 2008 against the Tennessee Titans he confidently secured a loose football in the end zone against the visiting Titans, capping a 23-0 shutout. Richard was named to PFW's All-Rookie team for his role on the interior offensive line for the Colts.

On September 12, 2011, he was waived by the Colts. Jameson Richard was re-signed by the Indianapolis Colts.

New England Patriots
Richard was signed to the New England Patriots on May 25, 2012. He was placed on injured reserve on August 2 after suffering a concussion during training camp.

References

External links

1984 births
Living people
People from Weston, Connecticut
Sportspeople from Fairfield County, Connecticut
Players of American football from Connecticut
American football centers
American football offensive guards
Buffalo Bulls football players
Indianapolis Colts players
New England Patriots players